Luthulenchelys heemstraorum is a species of eel in the family Ophichthidae. It is the only member of its genus. It is known only in the Indian Ocean in the vicinity of South Africa.

References

Ophichthidae
Fish described in 2007